Kyle House is a historic home located at Fayetteville, Cumberland County, North Carolina.

The original Kyle House, home to merchant James Kyle, burned in a city fire in 1831. Rumor had it that the great fire began in the Kyle House's kitchen. It was then rebuilt in about 1855 as a two-story, five bay, brick town house with Greek Revival and Italianate style design elements.  It features a three bay wide one-story porch with a flat roof supported by four fluted Doric order columns.

It was listed on the National Register of Historic Places in 1972.

References

Houses on the National Register of Historic Places in North Carolina
Greek Revival houses in North Carolina
Italianate architecture in North Carolina
Houses completed in 1855
Houses in Fayetteville, North Carolina
National Register of Historic Places in Cumberland County, North Carolina